The Collège de la Sagesse is a Lebanese major national and Catholic school founded in 1875 by the Maronite archbishop of Beirut at the time, Joseph Debs who laid the first stone of the original building. The school originally known as l'École de la Sagesse is one of the oldest educational institutions in Lebanon and the region. The school offers programs leading to the Lebanese Baccalaureate and the French Baccalaureate. It serves toute petite section through terminale S (the final year of lycée or senior high school/sixth form college).

The campus included a famous Institut de Droit for higher education preparing lawyers after graduation from the college. In addition to a degree in Civil Law, the institute also offered Christian Canonical Law.

The college boasts amongst its graduates some of the most prominent Lebanese political, religious and artistic personalities stretched on many decades.

Sagesse network

Sagesse is a renowned network of academic and technical institutions operating in Lebanon, administered by the Maronite Catholic Archeparchy of Beirut, and teaching more than 9,000 students. The network includes schools, technical institutions, and a university.

The school's historical main campus is in Ashrafieh, Beirut and is now known as Le Collège de la Sagesse Saint Joseph – Ashrafieh as St. Joseph is the patron saint of the school.

The Sagesse school network comprises 
Sagesse Saint-Joseph, the main campus in Ashrafieh, Beirut, Lebanon 
Sagesse Saint-Maron, main campus in Jdeideh, Matn District 
Sagesse Saint-Élie, also known as Sagesse Clemenceau, in West Beirut 
Sagesse Saint Jean-Maron, campus in Ain el-Remmaneh, Baabda District 
Sagesse Saint-Jean, campus in Brasilia, Baabda District 
Sagesse Sainte-Marie - providing Lebanese and English programs accredited by the Middle States Association of colleges and schools.
Sagesse High School, Ain Saadeh, Matn District 

Schools of higher learning associated with the school are L'Ecole Technique de la Sagesse that has two sections, in Achrafieh and Ain el Remmaneh. Université La Sagesse (containing 7 faculties) operates on two campuses in Beirut.

Father Jean-Paul Abu Ghazalé currently serves as the principal of Sagesse Saint Joseph. The Sagesse network is currently running under the administration of Mgr. Paul Youssef Matar, Archeparch of the Maronite Catholic Archeparchy of Beirut.

See also
 Education in the Ottoman Empire
 Sagesse SC

References

External links
 Collège de la Sagesse - Main and St. Joseph 
 Sagesse Saint Maron
 Sagesse Saint Elie or Sagesse Clemenceau
 Sagesse Saint Jean-Maron
 Sagesse Saint Jean - Brasilia
 Sagesse High School

French international schools in Lebanon
Schools in Beirut
Schools in Lebanon
1875 establishments in the Ottoman Empire
Educational institutions established in 1875